The North–South Corridor (NSC), originally conceptualised as the North-South Expressway, is an under-construction expressway that will be the 11th of Singapore's network of expressways when completed. The North South Corridor will serve increasing traffic along the north-south corridor that is currently served by the Central Expressway (CTE). The  expressway will cost about S$7–8 billion when fully completed in 2026 as North-South Corridor and will connect the East Coast Parkway (ECP) with the northern parts of Singapore.

The NSC will have a total of 16 entrances and 17 exits to connect towns along the north-south corridor—Woodlands, Sembawang, Yishun, Ang Mo Kio, Bishan and Toa Payoh—with the city centre. The NSC will also provide links to existing expressways, including the Seletar Expressway (SLE), Pan-Island Expressway (PIE) and East Coast Parkway (ECP).

According to the Land Transport Authority, the continuous bus lanes along the NSC will be able to reduce bus travelling times from Woodlands, Sembawang, Yishun and Ang Mo Kio to the city by up to 30 minutes through morning and evening peak express bus services, and also make bus connections between residential towns along the NSC faster by allowing intra-town buses to leverage the ramps and bus lanes on the surface, 
A cycling path along the entire stretch of the highway will link up the Park Connector Networks and dedicated cycling path networks within HDB towns along the entire corridor to the city centre.

The North-South Corridor was initially targeted to be ready by 2023. However, due to significant delays in construction, the deadline has been pushed back to 2026.

History
The expressway was first announced as the North South Expressway on 30 January 2008 as part of a major review of Singapore's transport network by the Land Transport Authority (LTA).

On 19 January 2011, the government gave the green light to build the expressway between Admiralty Road West and Toa Payoh Rise. On 15 November 2011, LTA unveiled the full alignment of the North-South Corridor. The land was acquired earlier so that the owners will be given sufficient time to move house, with construction initially planned to begin in 2017 with an expected completion date of 2023. The corridor became an integrated transport corridor in 2016, with the land being cleared for the construction of North-South Corridor, works are ready to start in 2018 and complete by 2026.

On 2 October 2020, it was announced that the major traffic junction at Novena linking Newton Road, Moulmein Road and Thomson Road, will be adjusted to make way for the construction of expressway tunnels.

Route
In the final plan, the NSC will commence at Admiralty Road West in northern Singapore and proceed southwards along Woodlands Avenue 8, Gambas Avenue, Sembawang Road. It will join Lentor Ave and intersect the Seletar Expressway.  On Marymount Road, the expressway tunnel is being built together with the station box for Teck Ghee station on the upcoming Cross Island MRT line.  Major bus stops will be equipped with lift lobbies at Lentor Avenue, Ang Mo Kio Avenue 6 and Marymount Road. It will also pass through the two military training areas - Lentor and Seletar East, both of which will be cleared by 2017. It will pass Toa Payoh Rise, join Thomson Road and Bukit Timah Road running parallel to the Central Expressway. The NSC will continue along Ophir Road, joining the East Coast Parkway at its southern terminus. In addition, there will be new bus lanes and cycling lanes.

Some land has to be acquired by the government for the project. The Land Transport Authority tried to utilize state land as far as possible, reducing the number of private properties that have to be acquired. Despite much of the expressway running underground at its southern end, some land had to be taken because of existing Mass Rapid Transit tunnels, and also because the expressway had to be straight to maintain traffic speeds. One of the prominent landmarks that has to make way for the project is the Rochor Centre. Novena Square underpasses will also be demolished, and the former Ellison Building may be considered for demolition.

References

External links

Expressways in Singapore
Road tunnels in Singapore
Woodlands, Singapore
Yishun
Mandai
Ang Mo Kio
Bishan, Singapore
Toa Payoh
Novena, Singapore
Kallang
Downtown Core (Singapore)
Proposed roads in Singapore
Buildings and structures under construction in Singapore
Transport in Central Region, Singapore